United Broadcasting Company was a West Coast radio network based in Los Angeles, California which began on November 5, 1930. UBC was known as The Silver Network. Louis L. Davis was Chairman. UBC had 9 affiliate stations including KFWB in Hollywood, California. On February 26, 1931 UBC announced it had merged with NBS - The Northwest Broadcasting System and Pacific Broadcasting Corp. UBC suspended operations on April 1, 1931.

Source: The Portland Oregon Journal newspaper; The Portland Telegram newspaper.

Defunct radio broadcasting companies of the United States
Companies based in California
1930 establishments in the United States
1931 disestablishments in the United States